The 14th Negeri Sembilan State election was held on 9 May 2018, to elect the State Assemblymen of the Negeri Sembilan State Legislative Assembly, the legislature of the Malaysian state of Negeri Sembilan. The previous state election was held on 5 May 2013. The state assemblymen is elected to 5 years term each.

The Negeri Sembilan State Legislative Assembly was dissolved on 7 April 2018 by the Head of State (Yang di-Pertuan Besar of Negeri Sembilan) on the advice of the Head of Government (Menteri Besar of Negeri Sembilan).

The election was held concurrently with the 2018 Malaysian general election.

In a historic result, Barisan Nasional (BN), the ruling coalition was ousted from power by Pakatan Harapan (PH). Since the first Negeri Sembilan state election in 1955, BN or its predecessor Alliance had never lost the state election. PH won 20 seats in the election, gaining a simple majority, while BN won 16. Aminuddin Harun from PH's component party PKR was sworn in as new Menteri Besar on 12 May 2018.

Contenders
Barisan Nasional (BN) contested in all 36 seats in Negeri Sembilan State Legislative Assembly. United Malays National Organisation (UNMO) contested in 22 seats, Malaysian Chinese Association (MCA) contested in 10 seats, Malaysian Indian Congress (MIC) and Parti Gerakan Rakyat Malaysia (Gerakan) contested in 2 seats each.

Pakatan Harapan (PH) contested in 35 seats in Negeri Sembilan. People's Justice Party (PKR) contested in 11 seats, Democratic Action Party (DAP) contested in 11 seats, Malaysian United Indigenous Party (Bersatu) contested in 6 seats and National Trust Party (Amanah) contested in 7 seats.

Pan-Malaysian Islamic Party (PAS) contested in 27 seats in Negeri Sembilan and lost in all of them.

Political parties

The contested seats

Results

Seats that changed allegiance

Election pendulum 
The 14th General Election witnessed 20 governmental seats and 16 non-governmental seats filled the Negeri Sembilan State Legislative Assembly. The government side has 11 safe seats and 1 fairly safe seat, while the non-government side has 3 safe seats and 3 fairly safe seats. In addition, there were 1 seat that win uncontested in non-governmental seats; namely Rantau (won by incumbent assemblyman, Mohamad Hasan).

Aftermath

Rantau seat nomination dispute
Rantau constituency incumbent assemblyman and Barisan Nasional candidate Mohamad Hasan won his seat uncontested after People's Justice Party (PKR)’s candidate Dr Streram Sinnansamy was not allowed to enter the Nomination Centre to file his papers by the Election Commission (EC), supposedly because he did not have in his possession a pass issued by the Election Commission. However, the Election Court has on the 16 November 2018, allowed the petition by Dr S. Streram and passed a ruling that Mohamad Hasan had not been duly elected, subsequently nullified Hasan's result. A by-election was then held on 13 April 2019 after Mohamad Hasan's appeal was dismissed by the Federal Court on 18 February 2019. Mohamad Hasan somehow emerged victorious and managed to retain his seat again.

References

Negeri Sembilan state elections
Negeri Sembilan
Negeri Sembilan